Don't Play the Fool ...  is a Russian comedy film by Valeri Chikov. It shows unlight relations between the USSR and the United States after the Cold War, with a tragicomic side.

Plot 
Americans have decided to make sure that a diamond deposit in the villages of Arkhangelsk is found and have sent a submarine under the command of a black veteran, who accompanied Allied convoys during the 2nd World War. As a diversion, a 200-liter alcohol barrel is planted on the bank, which was soon caught by the local blacksmith Filimon (Yevdokimov). On this occasion, the village stages festivities, which all the American submariners will gradually become involved in, in spite of their wishes. The black veteran finds his grandson, who was born in Filimon's family.

During the celebration, the barn catches fire. In a panic, drunk people run away from the barn, who until then, had sung songs and drunk alcohol, but Filimon, risking their lives, enters the burning barn and an empty barrel rolls out of it. The barn burns down and falls on the background of the Russian Orthodox Church under the lyrical music. Filimon is sentenced to two years in prison for disturbing public order, having confiscated all his weapons.

At the end of the film, a Japanese submarine arrives at the same village, and Filimon once again catches a barrel of pure alcohol.

Cast 
The cast of the film:
 Mikhail Yevdokimov as Filimon
 Lev Durov as Grandfather
 Valeri Zolotukhin as Vanya Taratakin
 Olga Ostroumova as Polina
 Vladimir Kashpur as General
 Semyon Altov as member of Expedition
 Valeri Chikov
 Grigory Siyatvinda as Vasya
 Tatyana Kravchenko as Zina
 Alexander Pyatkov as  Kutusov 
 Sergei Agapitov as Pashka Goos
 Yuri Oleinikov
 Andrei Nikolaev
 Alexander Wigdorov
 Scott Kinninhaim
 Austin Ti Smot
 Kevin McGeer

References

External links
 
  

1997 films
Russian crime comedy-drama films
Russian mystery films
1990s Russian-language films
1990s crime comedy-drama films